Flying fox is a common name for bats of the genus Pteropus.

Flying fox or Flying Fox may also refer to:
Acerodon, another genus of bats found in Southeast Asia
Desmalopex, two further species of bats:
 White-winged flying fox (Desmalopex leucopterus)
 Small white-winged flying fox (Desmalopex microleucopterus)
Flying Fox, character's name in the comic adaptation of Foxbat (RPG character) in the game Champions
Flying fox, common name used for zip-line in Australia and New Zealand 
Flying fox (fish), a species of cyprinid fish
The Flying Fox (film), a 1964 Hong Kong film
Flying Fox (horse), a thoroughbred horse
HMS Flying Fox, Royal Navy ship
HMS Flying Fox (shore establishment), a shore establishment of the Royal Navy
Flying Fox (DC Comics), a character in the Young All-Stars comic

See also
Flying Fox of Snowy Mountain (disambiguation)
Other Tales of the Flying Fox (disambiguation)